Sanjay Rajiv Beach (born February 21, 1966) is a former American professional football player who played wide receiver for four seasons for the New York Jets, the Green Bay Packers, and the San Francisco 49ers of the National Football League (NFL).

Early years 
Beach played high school football at Chandler High School and college football at Colorado State University, from which he graduated in 1988 with a bachelor's degree in communication.

Professional career

Dallas Cowboys 
After suffering a knee injury, Beach was cut by the Dallas Cowboys in 1988.

New York Jets 
Beach spent the 1989 season with the New York Jets, where he played in only one game and had no receptions.

San Francisco 49ers 
First signing on with the team in 1991, Beach caught four passes for 43 yards that first season. After leaving for the Packers in free agency, he returned in 1993 and caught five passes for 59 yards.

Green Bay Packers 
In a game against the Tampa Bay Buccaneers, Beach caught Brett Favre's first NFL completion excluding a pass that was deflected and caught by Favre himself. Over the course of the season, Beach racked up career highs in catches (17), yards (122), and tied for his career high in touchdowns with one. Beach is one of two players of Indian descent to play in the NFL; former Packer linebacker Brandon Chillar is the other.

Amsterdam Admirals 
Beach attempted a comeback with the Amsterdam Admirals of NFL Europe in 1995.

Post-career life 
After four years in the NFL, Beach retired, and went on to receive his master's degree in business administration from Colorado State.  He is currently a financial advisor for Raymond James in Westlake, Ohio.

References

1966 births
Living people
American football wide receivers
American sportspeople of Indian descent
Amsterdam Admirals players
Colorado State Rams football players
Green Bay Packers players
New York Jets players
Players of American football from Arizona
San Francisco 49ers players
Sportspeople from Chandler, Arizona